Oscar Ludvig Larsen (20 March 1880 – ??) was a Norwegian politician for the Conservative Party.

He was elected to the Norwegian Parliament in 1919 from the constituency Aalesund og Molde, and was re-elected in 1922 from the Market towns of Møre og Romsdal county.

He was born in Ålesund, and worked as a wholesaler and ship-owner. From 1915 to 1925 he was a vice consul of Sweden. He was a member of Ålesund city council from 1907 to 1922.

References

1880 births
Year of death missing
Members of the Storting
Conservative Party (Norway) politicians
Møre og Romsdal politicians
Politicians from Ålesund
Norwegian businesspeople